Jiniv Joshi (born 30 October 1987) is an Indian cricketer. He made his first-class debut for Sebastianites Cricket and Athletic Club in Tier B of the 2019–20 Premier League Tournament in Sri Lanka on 31 January 2020.

References

External links
 

1987 births
Living people
Indian cricketers
Sebastianites Cricket and Athletic Club cricketers
Place of birth missing (living people)